Marc de Foy is a Canadian sports journalist. A journalist for Le Journal de Montréal, he won the Elmer Ferguson Memorial Award in 2010 and is a member of the media section of the Hockey Hall of Fame.

References

Canadian male journalists
Canadian sports journalists
Elmer Ferguson Award winners
French Quebecers
Living people
Year of birth missing (living people)